The Mindanao Peoples Caucus (MPC) is a grassroots network of Indigenous Peoples, Bangsamoro and Christian communities and leaders who have common vision for peace in Mindanao. MPC is known to have stood up for the struggle to finally resolve the age-old armed conflict in Mindanao through a negotiated political settlement that contains the essentials acceptable to both negotiating parties and that addresses the historical oppression and forced marginalization of the native inhabitants and indigenous peoples of this island.

As such, MPC is actively working for the strengthening of the participation and engagement of tripeoples grassroots constituency in the Mindanao peace process so as to allow their recognition as self-determining peoples who can develop and govern themselves in the economic, political, social and spiritual spheres of development.

Since its establishment in 2001, MPC has made various breakthroughs in the peacebuilding arena which facilitated significant gains in the peace process.

One of which is the formation of its independent ceasefire mechanism known as the “Bantay Ceasefire” which gained recognition and respect among the formal ceasefire mechanisms of both the government and the Moro Islamic Liberation Front (MILF). Bantay Ceasefire is composed of more than 600 volunteers, from Basilan, Lanao provinces, Cotabato, Maguindanao, Sultan Kudarat, Compostela Valley and Sulu, who are actively monitoring the implementation of the ceasefire agreement.

Given the serious humanitarian crisis that befell Mindanao, MPC has enhanced its work from ceasefire monitoring to humanitarian protection, dubbed as “Sagip Sibilyan”, in order to extend direct humanitarian assistance, from advocacy to capacity building interventions, to thousands of innocent civilians who became forced and direct victims of internal displacement, human rights abuses and military repression.

Since the outbreak of the war in August 2008, the Mindanao Peoples Caucus has been leading the campaign for a ceasefire amidst a highly polarized situation where Christian vigilante groups like the Ilaga (Rat) were pitted against Bangsamoro communities.  It has been a total shock among the Bantay Ceasefire volunteers who too were threatened because of their open support to the peace process.  Despite constant threats and intimidation and with the hawks gaining the upper hand within the government, the MPC did now step back in its peace advocacy.  Seeing the collapse of the ceasefire which Bantay Ceasefire members had painstakingly preserved through vigilance and monitoring work – MPC had to address a serious demoralization problem among its members some of them were even afraid of wearing their uniform vests.

August 2008 and the ensuing backlash in the peace talks leading to an open outbreak of armed hostilities and a massive humanitarian crisis had put to serious challenge MPC’s commitment to peacebuilding and peace advocacy.  The August 18 attack by the MILF in Kauswagan and Kolambogan had created such a highly emotional public outrage that even known civil society organizations and peace advocates within these areas at that time could not openly call for a ceasefire as it is misconstrued to be siding with the MILF. The mindset at that time was to avenge the death of innocent victims, have the civilians take up arms and fight to the end.

Ceasefire Campaign 

One of the major accomplishments of MPC during this dark period of the peace process is its leading role in the national campaign for a ceasefire in Mindanao which galvanized massive support from church, academe, business and the war-affected communities themselves.  While this achievement is of course attributable to so many interlocking efforts, MPC has been in the forefront of the campaigns from the grassroots to the halls of Malacanang in order to appeal for a ceasefire and bring national attention to the humanitarian crisis in Central Mindanao.  After 17 months of open armed hostilities which displaced over 600,000 people, Mindanao has finally reverted to a ceasefire, with the International Monitoring Team back in Mindanao.

In November 2009, the Bantay Ceasefire Assembly was convened in Marawi City.  The assembly succeeded in launching the new thrust of Bantay Ceasefire which is on Humanitarian Protection.  Dubbed as “Sagip Sibilyan”, Bantay Ceasefire’s work will now focus in alleviating the suffering of the civilians who are caught in the conflict through a programmatic humanitarian protection work.  This will cover work on early warning, disaster response and promotion of human rights.  This will also include providing legal services or referral of cases involving violations of human rights and war crimes in order to break the impunity for these abuses.  This will not however mean that BC will no longer conduct its regular monitoring of the ceasefire agreement.

There are clearly good lessons that can be drawn from the MOA-AD experience which can shed light on how to move forward.  The key here is that civil society and peace advocates recognize, accept and learn from those lessons.

One lesson that MPC offers is that peace education and peacebuilding efforts fell short in educating our communities, schools, families and the public at large on the root causes of the armed conflict in Mindanao which include the legitimate claim of the Bangsamoro and indigenous peoples to their ancestral domain.  The peace movement in general, and that includes MPC, has failed to raise the awareness of ordinary Mindanaoans on the historical background of the conflict and why we should all work for the finding of a just and mutually acceptable political solution to the problem.  The peace movement cannot simply afford to be an onlooker to this lingering armed conflict.

MPC membership in the IMT 

Last October 27, 2009, the peace panels in the GRP-MILF talks have agreed on a Framework on Civilian Protection which they have signed in Kuala Lumpur.  In a follow-up meeting on December 8–9, both panels agreed to add on the mandate of the International Monitoring Team the Civil Protection Component (CPC), which is basically aimed at restraining the combatants from any act that will undermine the safety and security of the civilians.

To help fulfill this mandate, the peace panels have invited the Mindanao Peoples Caucus together with the Nonviolent Peaceforce to become part of the Civilian Protection Component (CPC) of the IMT.  While protection work is not new with MPC, doing the work as IMT is definitely an altogether different function.  The opportunity to help alleviate the sufferings of the civilians by doing protection work within a recognized formal mechanism of the government and MILF, however, opens a lot of possibilities to be able to institutionalize protection work.  Thus, the MPC accepted the invitation to join the IMT, mindful of the fact that such decision will have to require program adjustments and realignment of some MPC members to join the IMT.

A significant achievement of MPC’s for this period is the evolution of its women program which will primarily focus in operationalizing the UN Security Council Resolution 1325 in the Philippine context of the peace and security processes.  This will entail mobilizing women leaders in the peace talks, ceasefire monitoring, disaster response, early warning, civilian protection, peacekeeping and security sector reform.  Building on the Women Framework on Civilian Protection which was submitted by MPC to the peace panels in September 2009, the women program will pursue the protection work as outlined in that framework parallel to the operations International Monitoring Team.

References

External links
 Mindanao Peoples Caucus

Mindanao